Ptychadena perplicata is a species of frog in the family Ptychadenidae.
It is found in Angola, Zambia, and possibly Democratic Republic of the Congo.
Its natural habitats are moist savanna and intermittent freshwater marshes.

References

Ptychadena
Taxa named by Raymond Laurent
Amphibians described in 1964
Taxonomy articles created by Polbot